Berthe Constance Ursule Art (26 December 1857 – 27 February 1934) was a Belgian still life painter.

Biography
She was born in Brussels as the daughter of Ferdinand Art and Constance Luc. She never married and lived and worked on 28 Blanchestraat in Sint-Gillis (Brussels). she was trained by Alfred Stevens and advised by Franz Binjé. Her painting Study of Still life: Grapes and Partridges was included in the 1905 book Women Painters of the World. Berthe Art exhibited her work at the Palace of Fine Arts and The Woman's Building at the 1893 World's Columbian Exposition in Chicago, Illinois.

Circle of Women Painters
She became a member of the Brussels-based club called Cercle des Femmes Peintres which was active 1888–1893. They were the Belgian equivalent of the French Union des Femmes Peintres et Sculpteurs. Other members were Jeanne Adrighetti, Alix d'Anethan, Marie de Bièvre, Marguérite Dielman, Mathilde Dupré-Lesprit, Mary Gasparioli, Marie Heijermans, Pauline Jamar, Rosa Leigh, Alice Ronner, Henriëtte Ronner-Knip, Rosa Venneman, Marguerite Verboeckhoven, Emma Verwee and Marie de Villermont. They organized art shows in the local Brussels museum from 1888 but were disbanded by 1902.

Galerie Lyceum
She began a Brussels gallery in 1911 together with some friends from the (by then defunct) Circle of Women Painters. The gallery was called the Galerie Lyceum. Founding members were Alice Ronner, Emma Ronner, Anna Boch, Louise Danse, Marie Danse, Juliette Wytsman and Ketty Gilsoul-Hoppe.

Gallery

References 

1857 births
1934 deaths
Artists from Brussels
Belgian women painters
Belgian still life painters
19th-century Belgian painters
20th-century Belgian painters
19th-century Belgian women artists
20th-century Belgian women artists